"Lay Your Head on Me" is a song by American music project Major Lazer, featuring vocals from British musician and lead singer of the band Mumford & Sons, Marcus Mumford. It was released as the fifth single from Major Lazer's fourth studio album, Music Is the Weapon, on March 26, 2020. The song was written by Henry Agincourt Allen, Karen Marie Aagaard Ørsted Andersen, Jasper Helderman, Mumford, Thomas Pentz and Bas van Daalen.

Background
According to a press release, the collaboration came about after Marcus Mumford and Diplo became friends and started experimenting in the studio together. Danish pop star MØ, who has previously worked with Major Lazer on "Lean On", "Lost" and "Cold Water", also co-wrote the song.

Chart performance
The single became Major Lazer’s third number one, as well as Mumford’s first, to reach  Billboard’s Dance/Mix Show Airplay chart in its August 22, 2020 issue.

Charts

Weekly charts

Year-end charts

Release history

References

2020 singles
2020 songs
Major Lazer songs
Marcus Mumford songs
Song recordings produced by Diplo
Songs written by Diplo
Songs written by King Henry (producer)
Songs written by Marcus Mumford
Songs written by MØ
Songs written by Will Grands